Martinec (feminine Martincová) is a Czech surname. Notable people include:
 Boris Martinec, Croatian figure skater
 Emil Martinec, American physicist
 Eva Martincová, Czech tennis player
 Hynek Martinec, Czech painter
 Patrik Martinec, Czech ice hockey player
 Přemysl Martinec, Czech surrealist
 Tereza Martincová, Czech tennis player
 Vladimír Martinec, Czech ice hockey player

Czech-language surnames